Hoyle John Granger (born March 7, 1944) is a former collegiate and professional American football player in the United States. He played his college football at Mississippi State. He was the first pick in the fifth round of the 1966 American Football League (AFL) draft, by the Houston Oilers. He was an AFL All-Star in 1967 and 1968.

Early life
Hoyle John Granger was born on March 7, 1944. He was a two-time all-state halfback for Oberlin High School (1960, 61). The Oberlin High football team finished as Class B state runners-up in 1958 and 1959 and were Class B State Champions in 1961, the school's only football state title to date. He was named the Class B MVP in 1961 after scoring 199 points and averaging 12.5 yards per carry that season.

College
Hoyle attended Mississippi State University out of high school and was a three-time letter winner and three-time all-conference halfback during his time in Starkville from 1963 to 1965. Granger finished his career at Mississippi State third all-time on the school's rushing leaders list (now 25th).

Pro career
Granger was drafted as the first pick of the fifth-round (37th Overall) of the 1966 AFL Draft by the Houston Oilers. Granger rushed for 388 yards and one touchdown in his rookie season while also accounting for 104 receiving yards and one receiving touchdown. In his second season in 1967 he moved to fullback and had a break-out season, rushing the ball 236 times for 1,194 yards and six touchdowns plus 300 yards and three touchdowns receiving. He was named an AFL All-Star that year and led the league in yards from scrimmage that season with 1,494 and was second in rushing yards. He was named an AFL All-Star again in 1968, 848 yards and seven touchdowns, finishing fourth in the league in rushing yards that year. In 1969, Granger rushed for 740 yards and three touchdowns rushing and 330 yards and one touchdown receiving. Granger accounted for only 287 yards from scrimmage and one touchdown for the Oilers in 1970. He spent the 1971 season with the New Orleans Saints before returning to the Oilers in 1972, which was his final season in professional football. In his career, Granger accounted for 4,992 yards from scrimmage and 24 total touchdowns.

Accomplishments
Louisiana Class B All-State halfback (1960, 61)
1961 Louisiana Class B MVP
Louisiana Class B State Champion (1961)
All-SEC halfback (1963–65)
AFL All-Star (1967, 68)
1968 AFL yards from scrimmage leader
Currently ranks sixth all-time in rushing yards for the Houston Oilers/Tennessee Titans
Inducted to the Louisiana Sports Hall of Fame in 2005.
Inducted to the Mississippi Sports Hall of Fame in 2008.
Inducted to the Mississippi State University Athletic Hall of Fame in 2008.
Named Greatest Athlete Ever from Allen Parish in 2017

See also
 Other American Football League players

References

1944 births
Living people
People from Oberlin, Louisiana
Players of American football from Louisiana
American football running backs
Mississippi State Bulldogs football players
Houston Oilers players
New Orleans Saints players
American Football League players
American Football League All-Star players